This is a list of rocket and mortar attacks on Israel and the Israeli-occupied Golan Heights carried out by Palestinian militant groups and/or Muslim Shia or Sunni militant groups from Lebanon.

Palestinian insurgency (1968–1982)

 July 1981: the PLO opened a heavy and indiscriminate artillery barrage on the Galilee panhandle using Katyusha rockets and 130mm guns. This barrage lasted 10 days driving the residents of northern Israel underground into bomb shelters.
 June 1982: Twenty villages were targeted in Galilee bombardment by the PLO and 3 Israelis were wounded.

Conflict with Hezbollah 

 On 31 March 1995, a rocket attack on Nahariyya in Western Galilee kills an 18-year-old.
 April 9, 1996, A heavy rocket barrage, launched by Hezbollah upon the cities of Galilee caused the initiation of the Operation Grapes of Wrath by the IDF.

2006 Lebanon War 

 During the 2006 Lebanon War, Lebanese Shi'a Islamist militant group and political party Hezbollah fired some 4,000 rockets at Israel.

After 2006 Lebanon War 
United Nations Security Council Resolution 1701, adopted at the end of the 2006 Lebanon War, called for a full cessation of hostilities between Lebanon and Israel and for the Lebanese government to take full control of its territory, and it authorized the United Nations Interim Force in Lebanon (UNIFIL) "to ensure that its area of operations is not utilized for hostile activities of any kind". Nevertheless, since the war, there have been multiple rocket attacks on Israel from Lebanon. The Lebanese government has not claimed responsibility for any of the attacks, and has disavowed some of them.

As of September 2009, There were an estimated 30,000 rockets in southern Lebanon, near Israel's border, all under the control of Hezbollah.

June 17, 2007
Two Katyusha rockets were fired from Lebanon at northern Israel, striking the town of Kiryat Shmona. The rockets caused some damage but no casualties.

Israeli Prime Minister Ehud Olmert called the incident "very disturbing". Russian ambassador to Lebanon Sergei Boukin voiced concern about the incident and said it was a violation of UN Resolution 1701.

Hezbollah denied responsibility. A previously unknown militant Islamic group calling itself "Jihadi Badr Brigades – Lebanon branch" claimed responsibility and vowed to continue attacks, saying: "We had promised our people jihad. Here, we again strike the Zionists when a group from the Jihadi Badr Brigades struck the Zionists in the occupied Palestinian territory."

January 8, 2009
At least three Katyusha rockets were fired from southern Lebanon into the area of Nahariya in northern Israel. One of the rockets directly hit a nursing home for the elderly. At least two people were wounded, one suffering a broken leg, and others suffered from shock. A witness said that the second floor of the facility, where the residents sleep, sustained heavy damage, and that many lives were saved because they were in the dining hall at the time. Israel Police ordered residents of the city to remain close to fortified areas, and Shlomi Regional Council residents were told to open their bomb shelters; school in the area was cancelled. The incident took place during the Gaza War.

Israel responded by firing five artillery shells into Lebanon, which it said was a pinpoint response at the source of fire.

The Lebanese Office of the Prime Minister rejected the attack on Israel, saying: "Prime Minister Siniora regards what happened in the south as a violation of the international resolution 1701 and something he does not accept and Siniora called for an investigation into the incident". Hezbollah denied involvement, as did Hamas sources in Lebanon. An official from the Popular Front for the Liberation of Palestine-General Command did not deny responsibility for the attack, and stated: "Don't be surprised to see more rockets launched into northern Israel. It's a normal response to Israel's brutal aggression."

January 14, 2009
In the second such attack in a week, rockets were fired from Lebanon into Israel, landing near the town of Kiryat Shmona. No injury or damage was reported. Residents fled to bomb shelters.

According to Haaretz, the attack and the previous one were carried out by Hezbollah through the proxy of the Popular Front for the Liberation of Palestine – General Command, a close Hezbollah ally.

United Nations Secretary General Ban Ki-Moon expressed alarm at the incident and urged restraint from all sides.

February 21, 2009
Two rockets were fired from near the Lebanese coastal town of Naqoura into northern Israel, one striking a mostly Christian Arab Israeli village. At least one person was lightly injured.

Israel responded by firing some six artillery shells at the launch area, causing no injuries.

Lebanese Prime Minister Fuad Saniora said that the rockets "threatened security and stability" in the region and violated UN Resolution 1701. He also called Israel's retaliation "an unjustified violation of Lebanese sovereignty."

September 11, 2009
Two Katyusha rockets were fired from Lebanon into northern Israel, one striking near Nahariya and another near Kibbutz Gesher Haziv. No damage or injury was reported. A witness said that the rockets had sparked panic, with residents entering bunkers and children being evacuated from schools. Israeli Prime Minister Benjamin Netanyahu said that the attack violated United Nations Security Council Resolution 1701 and that Israel would hold the Lebanese government accountable for it.

Israel responded by firing some 12 artillery shells at the launch area, near Qlayleh. No damage or injury was reported.

The United Nations condemned the attack on Israel and urged both sides "to exercise maximum restraint."

According to Lebanese commentators, the attack on Israel was connected to the country's political crisis exacerbated by Saad Hariri's inability to form a government. United Nations Interim Force in Lebanon (UNIFIL) spokesman Milos Strugar blamed radicals from Palestinian refugee camps in southern Lebanon for the attack.

UNIFIL had been warned of a possible attack 10 days before it occurred, and the UN body informed the Lebanese army two days before the attack.

October 27, 2009
A Katyusha rocket was fired from Lebanese town of Hula into northern Israel, striking an open area east of Kiryat Shmona. The rocket caused a fire, but no serious damage or injury was reported. An Israeli military spokeswoman said Israel was treating the shooting "very seriously" and that it held the Lebanese government responsible.

Israel responded with artillery fire at Lebanon, causing no casualties, and lodged a complaint with the United Nations.

The Brigades of Abdullah Azzam, Battalions of Ziad Jarrah, a group linked to Al-Qaeda, claimed responsibility. In a statement, the group linked the attack to the 2009 Temple Mount riots: "The occupying Jews have dared to repeatedly raid the courtyard of Al-Aqsa Mosque ... In response to this aggression, a battalion among the Battalions of Ziad Jarrah" fired the Katyusha, the group said. Nevertheless, Lebanese President Michel Suleiman said that an "Israeli agent" was responsible for the attack.

The United States condemned the attack and, in a reference to Hezbollah, said it underscored the need to disarm all Lebanese groups.

UNIFIL launched an inquiry into the incident. The following day, the Lebanese military discovered four more rockets, ready to be fired, in the garden and on the balcony of a house belonging to the mayor of Hula.

The Lebanese Army later arrested Fadi Ibrahim of Ein el-Hilweh near Sidon for firing the rocket. Ibrahim was said to be a member of Fatah al-Islam, which is linked to al-Qaida. According to Lebanese daily A-Safir, Ibrahim and his followers were responsible for the subsequently discovered rockets as well.

November 29, 2011
Shortly after midnight, four 122-millimeter rockets were fired at Israel from an area between Aita Shaab and Rumaysh in southern Lebanon. Two rockets landed near the Israeli localities of Biranit and Netu'a in the Western Galilee, some 700 meters from the Lebanese border. No injuries or damage were reported. Two additional rockets severely damaged a chicken coop and caused a propane gas tank to go up in flames. The Israel Defense Forces returned artillery fire at the launch site, causing no casualties.

The Abdullah Azzam Brigades, a group affiliated with al-Qaeda, reportedly claimed responsibility for the attack on Israel. Part of a statement attributed to the group read: "On Tuesday morning 29/11/2011 a unit from Abdullah Azzam Brigades shelled Zionist settlements in north Palestine from south Lebanon and the missiles have hit their targets. Victory is but from God." The group later denied this and implied that responsibility lay with Syria and Hezbollah. Hezbollah itself denied any connection to the attack.

United Nations Secretary-General Ban Ki-moon condemned the attack and called for "maximum restraint" from the parties concerned. The United States State Department also condemned the attack, calling it a "provocative act" that undermined Lebanon's stability and violated Resolution 1701.

December 11, 2011
A rocket fired at Israel from the southern Lebanese village of Majdal Silim fell short and hit a home in Hula, Lebanon, injuring a Lebanese woman.

November 21, 2012
Two rockets fired from Lebanon at Israel landed within Lebanon, according to Beirut officials.

The previous day, a Lebanese army patrol had discovered two ready-to-launch 107mm Grad rockets between the villages of Halta and Mari, about 2 miles from the Israeli border. The forces defused the rockets. IDF official Brig. Gen. Yoav Mordechai said Palestinian factions in Lebanon were probably behind the plot.

On November 22, the Lebanese army disarmed an additional rocket aimed at Israel, in Marjayoun, about 10 kilometers from the border.

May 26, 2013
A rocket was fired from south Lebanon towards Israel, but it was not clear where the rocket landed and there were no immediate reports of damage inside Israel.

August 22, 2013
Four Katyusha rockets fired from southern Lebanon targeted northern Israel, setting off air-raid sirens in Acre, Nahariya and additional areas in the Western Galilee, causing no casualties but some damage. The Iron Dome defense system intercepted one of the rockets. The Abdallah Azzam Brigades claimed responsibility for the attack. The United States condemned the rocket fire and called it a violation of UN Security Council Resolution 1701. Israel retaliated by carrying out an airstrike on a target near Beirut.

July 11, 2014
Three rockets were fired toward Israel. IDF retaliated by firing about 25 artillery shells on the area.

July 14, 2014
Two Katyusha rockets launched from Lebanon against Israel's northern city of Nahariya landed in open territory. No injuries or damage were reported. IDF artillery responded by targeting the launch site in Lebanon.

August 24, 2014
A rocket fired from Lebanon hit a building in an open area in the Upper Galilee. Two children were lightly injured by shrapnel and four people were suffering from shock as a result of the attack.

August 25, 2014
Two rockets were fired into Israel by Lebanese militants, prompting rocket sirens in towns along the border, including Kiryat Shmona and Metula. IDF responded with artillery fire.

December 20, 2015 
Three rockets were fired into northwestern Israel. Sirens sounded in the area of Nahariya and Shlomi. No injuries were reported. The IDF responded with artillery fire. The attack came half a day after the killing of Samir Kuntar in Syria by the Israeli Air Force.

May 13, 2021 
Amidst the background of the 2021 Israel–Palestine crisis, three rockets were launched from the Qlaileh area towards northern Israel. The IDF stated that the rockets landed in the Mediterranean Sea, causing no damage or casualties, and witnesses in the Israeli city of Haifa reported hearing the three explosions from the rockets impacting the sea.

May 17, 2021 
For a second time during the 2021 Israel–Palestine crisis, rockets were fired from southern Lebanon towards northern Israel. According to the United Nations Interim Force in Lebanon, 6 rockets were fired from the Rachaya Al Foukhar area, triggering Red Alert sirens in the northern Israeli kibbutz of Misgav Am. The IDF responded to the rocket fire by firing around 22 artillery shells towards the source of the rocket fire.

May 19, 2021 
Once again during the 2021 Israel–Palestine crisis, four rockets were fired from southern Lebanon towards northern Israel, triggering Red Alerts in Haifa. One rocket was intercepted by Iron Dome, while another landed in an open area and two landed in the Mediterranean Sea. The IDF retaliated with artillery fire at the source of the rocket fire.

July 20, 2021 
In the early morning of July 20, two rockets were fired from southern Lebanon towards Israel. One rocket was intercepted by Iron Dome, while the other landed in an open area. The IDF retaliated by firing artillery shells at the source of the rocket fire.

August 4, 2021 
Just after noon on August 4, three rockets were fired from southern Lebanon towards Israel. Two rockets landed in Kiryat Shmona, while a third fell short in Lebanon. The IDF retaliated by firing dozens of artillery shells towards the source of the rocket fire and subsequently with airstrikes.

On August 6, Hezbollah fired a barrage of some 20 rockets into the Israeli-occupied Golan Heights in response to a previous Israeli airstrike inside Lebanon. The Iron Dome missile defense system intercepted ten of the rockets, while six fell in open areas near Shebaa Farms on the Lebanese border. The others fell inside Lebanon. There were no casualties or damage. Israeli artillery responded toward the area in Lebanon where the rocket fire originated from.

April 25, 2022 
Just after midnight on April 25, one rocket was fired from southern Lebanon into Israel. The rocket landed in an open area near Shlomi, without triggering a Red Alert. The IDF retaliated by firing artillery shells toward the source of the rocket fire.

See also
 History of the Israel Defense Forces
 Israeli-Lebanese conflict
 Palestinian rocket attacks on Israel
 Civil defense in Israel
 Israeli casualties of war
 Timeline of the Arab–Israeli conflict

References

Israeli–Lebanese conflict
Hezbollah–Israel conflict
Iran–Israel proxy conflict
2006 Lebanon War
Terrorist attacks attributed to Palestinian militant groups
rocket attacks from Lebanon on Israel
Lebanon-related lists
Lists of events in Israel